The Philippine long-tailed macaque (Macaca fascicularis philippensis) is a subspecies of the crab-eating macaque, known in various Philippine languages as matching/matsing or the more general term unggoy ("monkey"). It is endemic to the Philippine forests and woodlands, but especially in the mangrove forests of western central Philippines— particularly in Palawan, the Visayas, and Mindanao. The names M. f. philippinensis and M. f. philippinenesis have also been used, but arise from orthographical error.

Characteristics 
The Philippine long-tailed macaque has a reddish-brown coat. Males weigh , but females only attain .

Distribution and habitat
The Philippine long-tailed macaque is found on the Philippine islands of Balabac, Basilan, Biliran, Bohol, Busuanga, Camiguin, Catanduanes, Culion, Leyte, Luzon, northeastern Mindanao, Mindoro, Negros, Panay, Palawan, Samar, and Sibuyan.

Fossils
Fossils excavated in Palawan were identified as being of the Philippine long-tailed macaque, deer, Palawan bearded pig, Bornean tiger, small mammals, lizards, snakes and turtles. From the stone tools, besides the evidence for cuts on the bones, and the use of fire, it would appear that early humans had accumulated the bones.
In prehistoric times, the Greater Sunda Islands of Borneo might have been connected to Palawan during the penultimate and previous glacial periods, judging from the molecular phylogeny of murids.

See also
 Puerto Princesa Subterranean River National Park, Palawan

References

Macaca
Endemic fauna of the Philippines
Primates of Southeast Asia
Mammals of the Philippines
Near threatened animals
Vulnerable fauna of Asia